Billaea pectinata is a species of fly in the family Tachinidae.

Distribution
Albania, Bosnia and Herzegovina, Bulgaria, Croatia, Czech Republic, France, Germany, Greece, Hungary, Italy, Poland, Romania, Russia, Slovakia, Spain, Switzerland, Ukraine.

References

Dexiinae
Muscomorph flies of Europe
Insects described in 1826